The 2020–21 American Athletic Conference men's basketball season is scheduled to begin with practices in October 2020, followed by the start of the 2020–21 NCAA Division I men's basketball season in November 2020. Conference play will begin in December and conclude with the 2021 American Athletic Conference men's basketball tournament at Dickies Arena in Fort Worth, Texas. With UConn's departure on July 1, 2020, the American is back at 11 teams. For the 2020-21 Season due to COVID-19 pandemic  The scheduling format was changed to a 20-game, double round-robin conference schedules. Conference play in men’s basketball will began with three windows for games in December (Dec. 14-17, Dec. 21-23 and Dec. 28-31).

Previous season
Cincinnati, Houston and Tulsa were declared co-champions. The 2020 American Athletic Conference men's basketball tournament was supposed to be held at Dickies Arena in Fort Worth, Texas. Due to the coronavirus pandemic the tournament was cancelled on March 12, 2020 – only minutes before the first game was set to begin.

Precious Achiuwa from Memphis was named the AAC player of the year, Tulsa's Frank Haith was named coach of the year.

2020–21 will mark the first year of the AAC's new TV Contract. The deal includes a minimum of 65 regular-season games per season on ESPN, ESPN2 and ESPNU, with at least 25 on ESPN or ESPN2.  Complete annual coverage of the conference tournament across ESPN, ESPN2 and ESPNU, including the championship game on ESPN.

Head coaches

Coaching changes 
On November 17, 2020: Wichita State coach Gregg Marshall resigned following an investigation into allegations of verbal and physical abuse, Wichita State promoted assistant coach Isaac Brown, to interim coach. On February 26, 2021 he was named permanent head coach, agreeing to a five-year deal.

Coaches
Note: Stats are through the beginning of the season. All stats and records are from time at current school only

Notes:
 Overall and AAC records are from time at current school and are through the end of 2020–21 season. NCAA records include time at current school only.
 AAC records only, prior conference records not included.
*In current job

Preseason

Preseason media poll

On October 28, The American released the preseason Poll and other preseason awards

Preseason All-AAC

Regular season

Conference matrix
This table summarizes the head-to-head results between teams in conference play.

Player of the week
Throughout the regular season, the American Athletic Conference named a player and rookie of the week.

All-AAC Awards and Teams

Postseason

American Athletic Conference tournament

NCAA tournament 

The winner of the 2021 American Athletic Conference men's basketball tournament, will receive the conference's automatic bid to the 2021 NCAA Division I men's basketball tournament.

National Invitation tournament

NBA draft
The following list includes all AAC players who were drafted in the 2021 NBA draft.

References